Robert Pearson (1879–1956) was a Canadian politician.

Robert Pearson may also refer to:

Robert Pearson (stockbroker) (1871–1954), Scottish cricketer, lawyer and stockbroker
Robert E. Pearson (1928–2009), American producer
W. Robert Pearson (born 1943), American diplomat
Rob Pearson (born 1971), Canadian ice hockey player
Robert Pearson (Air Canada Flight 143), captain of a domestic passenger flight that ran out of fuel mid-flight

See also
 Bob Pearson (1907–1985), of the English variety act Bob and Alf Pearson
 Robert Peirson (1821–1891), English physicist
 Robert Person (born 1969), Major League Baseball pitcher